Lymington Town railway station serves the town of Lymington in Hampshire, England.

Celebrations were held at Lymington Town (as well as at Brockenhurst) in 2008 to mark the 150th anniversary of the line. The station is managed by South Western Railway, which also operates all trains serving it.

History
The Lymington Railway, running between Brockenhurst and Lymington was established in 1856 and opened to a temporary station at Lymington on 12 July 1858. A permanent station was opened at Lymington Town in 1860.  Three years later the company acquired a ferry to the Isle of Wight. The company was absorbed by the London and South Western Railway in 1879. Services were extended to Lymington Pier in 1884.

Motive Power Depot
The Lymington Railway built a small engine shed north of the station in 1858. This was extended in 1874, and remained open until 1966.

Services
All services at Lymington Town are operated by South Western Railway using Class 450 EMUs.

The typical off-peak service in trains per hour is:
 2 tph to 
 2 tph to 

Until 22 May 2010, the Lymington Branch Line was operated as a "heritage" service using restored Class 421 4Cig trains.

References

External links

Lymington
Railway stations in Hampshire
DfT Category E stations
Former London and South Western Railway stations
Railway stations in Great Britain opened in 1858
Railway stations served by South Western Railway
1858 establishments in England